Vem Pra Mim (1993) is the Puerto Rican boy band Menudo's 32nd album (5th in Portuguese).

It features Abel Talamántez, Alexis Grullón, Andy Blázquez, Ashley Ruiz, and new member Ricky López.  
Ricky replaced Adrián Olivares, who decided to leave the group.

Track listing
Vem Pra Mim (Alexis Grullon)
Juras De Amor (Ashley Ruiz) 
Parecendo Frio (Ashley Ruiz)
Quinze Anos (Alexis Grullon)
Beija Minha Alma (Abel Talamentez)
Nunca Mais (Ricky Lopez)
Eu So Queria (Alexis Grullon)
Raio De Lua (Ricky Lopez)
Lentes Escuras (Alexis Grullon)
Me Beija Aqui Na Praja (Ashley Ruiz)
Serenata Rock'N Roll (Abel Talamentez)
Deixa Eu Eer (Alexis Grullon)
 

Menudo (band) albums
1993 albums